Miss Teen USA 1983, the 1st Miss Teen USA pageant, was televised live from the Lakeland Civic Auditorium in Lakeland, Florida on 30 August 1983.  The event was hosted by Michael Young and included musical guest Air Supply. At the conclusion of the final competition, Ruth Zakarian of New York was crowned Miss Teen USA, by Miss USA 1983 Julie Hayek and Miss Universe 1983 Lorraine Downes.

Results

Placements

Final competition scores

 Winner 
 First runner-up
 Second runner-up 
 Third runner-up
 Fourth runner-up

Special awards

Historical significance 
 New York wins competition for the first time. Also becoming in the 1st state ever who wins Miss Teen USA.
 Virginia earns the 1st runner-up position for the first time. 
 Kentucky earns the 2nd runner-up position for the first time.
 Georgia earns the 3rd runner-up position for the first time.
 Texas earns the 4th runner-up position for the first time.
 Georgia, Kentucky, New York, Texas and Virginia made the first ever Miss Teen USA's final group.
 Arkansas placed for the first time. 
 California placed for the first time.
 Nevada placed for the first time.
 Pennsylvania placed for the first time.
 Washington placed for the first time.
 Arkansas, California, Nevada, Pennsylvania and Washington made the first ever Miss Teen USA's semifinals group.

Judges
Jeffery Apple
Tracey Bregman
Anthony Carter
Bonnie Kay
Emilio Estafan
Persis Khambatta
Andy Bean
Nancy Stafford
Teri Utley
Kiki Vandeweghe
Leroy Neiman

Delegates
The Miss Teen USA 1983 delegates were:

 Alabama - Jill Johnson (17)
 Alaska - Linda Fickus (18)
 Arizona - Kris Keim (17)
 Arkansas - Angela Boyd (18)
 California - Shawn Gardner (17)
 Colorado - Julie Meyer (18)
 Connecticut - Beth Waldron (14)
 Delaware - Laura Enslen (17)
 District of Columbia - Patricia Curtis (17)
 Florida - Lora Erdman (16)
 Georgia - Kelly Jerles (16)
 Hawaii - Erika Mattich (15)
 Idaho - Tammy Hamilton (17)
 Illinois - Linda Burkholder (17)
 Indiana - Julie James (17)
 Iowa - Kimberly Heck (16)
 Kansas - Melissa Lyczak (16)
 Kentucky - Krista Keith (15)
 Louisiana - Vail Cavalier (18)
 Maine - Dina Duvall (17)
 Maryland - Carla Kemp (18)
 Massachusetts - Christine Lawlor (16)
 Michigan - Cathy McBride (17)
 Minnesota - Kimberly Ess (17)
 Mississippi - Laura Zapponi (18)
 Missouri - Lisa Logan (16)
 Montana - Leslie Lucas (16)
 Nebraska - Jackie Kuenning (17)
 Nevada - Kimberly Cannon (18)
 New Hampshire - Maureen Murray (17)
 New Jersey - Sheri Drummond (17)
 New Mexico - Eloisa Serna (17)
 New York -  Ruth Zakarian (17)
 North Carolina - Janet Freeman (16)
 North Dakota - Lisa Rubin (18)
 Ohio - Jamie Callarik (15)
 Oklahoma - Lorna Webb (16)
 Oregon - Gretchen Thoma (15)
 Pennsylvania - Diane Hoyes (18)
 Rhode Island -  Melissa Sciarra (16)
 South Carolina - Beth Woodard (18)
 South Dakota - Karen Hernes (17)
 Tennessee - Cheri Dotson (16)
 Texas - Sheri Sholz (17)
 Utah - Natalie DeGraw (17)
 Vermont - Cindy Gentile (16)
 Virginia - Tina Marrocco (16)
 Washington - Rhonda Monroe (17)
 West Virginia - Kay Scadden (17)
 Wisconsin - Jane Zawada (17)
 Wyoming - Shanna Thompson (15)

Contestant notes
Kelly Jerles (Georgia) became the only delegate from Miss Teen USA 1983 to compete in the Miss America pageant.  She held the Miss Georgia 1987 title and won preliminary swimsuit and non-finalist talent awards at Miss America 1988.
Ruth Zakarian (New York) competed in the Miss USA 1984 pageant as Miss Teen USA 1983 but did not place.  In the early years of the pageant, the Teen titleholder could compete at Miss USA without holding a state title.
Beth Woodard (South Carolina) - Miss South Carolina USA 1987
Kris Keim (Arizona) - Miss Arizona USA 1988
Maureen Murray (New Hampshire) - Miss New York USA 1991 (semi-finalist at Miss USA 1991)

References

1983
1983 in Florida
1983 beauty pageants